KBLU (560 kHz) is a commercial AM radio station in Yuma, Arizona.  It is owned by El Dorado Broadcasters and airs a talk radio format.  The studios and offices are on West 28th Street in Yuma.  The transmitter is off South 20th Avenue in Yuma, at West Main Canal Road.

KBLU is powered at 1,000 watts, non-directional by day and using a directional antenna at night.  With its low dial position, KBLU can be heard around much of Southwest Arizona and Southeast California, including the communities of El Centro, Brawley and Blythe.  It also covers parts of Baja California and Sonora, Mexico.

Programming
Weekday mornings begin with a local news and conservative talk show hosted by Russ Clark.  The rest of the weekday schedule is made up of syndicated talk shows, including Rush Limbaugh, Sean Hannity, Glenn Beck, Dave Ramsey, Clyde Lewis, Coast to Coast AM with George Noory and This Morning, America's First News with Gordon Deal.  Weekends include shows on money, health, pets, law, real estate, house repair and technology.  Weekend syndicated hosts include Kim Komando, Bill Handel, Leo Laporte and Bill Cunningham.  Some hours are paid brokered programming.  Most hours begin with world and national news from Westwood One News.

History
The station is descended from two early radio stations, KYUM and KBLU, and operates on the oldest active radio license in the Yuma market.

KYUM
KYUM signed on March 3, 1940, at 1210 kilocycles. KYUM restored broadcasting to Yuma after the revocation of the license of KUMA forced it off the air a month prior. Twelve days after signing on, on March 15, KYUM became an NBC Red Network affiliate, with secondary affiliation with the NBC Blue Network (after 1945 ABC). The Yuma Broadcasting Company, 45 percent owned by KTAR radio in Phoenix, was a stockholder, and KYUM also became a link in its Arizona Broadcasting Company (later Arizona Broadcasting System) chain. It operated with 250 watts during the day and 100 watts at night. KYUM carried NBC and ABC's dramas, comedies, news, sports, soap operas, game shows and big band broadcasts during the "Golden Age of Radio."

With the enactment of the North American Regional Broadcasting Agreement (NARBA), KYUM moved to 1240 AM on March 29, 1941. In 1948, the Yuma Broadcasting Company received approval from the Federal Communications Commission (FCC) to move KYUM to 560 AM with 1,000 watts full-time; the move became effective on April 1, 1951. In 1961, KTAR bought out the remaining shareholders in Yuma Broadcasting Company, owning KYUM outright.

KBLU
Another Yuma radio station signed on September 6, 1959, as a 500-watt, daytime-only station at 1320 AM, with the call sign KBLU.  It was owned by the Desert Broadcasting Company, founded by Robert Crites, who served as the first general manager.  KBLU began airing a Top 40 format.

In 1963, its co-owned television station, channel 13 KBLU-TV (now KYMA-DT), signed on the air. KBLU-AM-TV were acquired by Eller Telecasting, a division of Karl Eller's outdoor advertising business, in 1967.

Two stations merge
On December 26, 1967, KTAR Broadcasting Company and Eller Outdoor Advertising Company announced their intention to merge to form Combined Communications Corporation. The merger, however, created a complication in Yuma, where Eller owned KBLU-AM-TV and KTAR owned KYUM. The FCC approved the merger in 1969 on the condition that one of the AM stations be divested. Due to a stronger signal and favorable dial position, the parent company chose to keep the 560 AM license, which became KBLU, and to donate the 1320 AM license to Arizona Western College. Arizona Western used the facility to start its own public radio station; AM 1320 took the call letters KAWC.

In 1973, KBLU founder Crites bought back KBLU-AM-TV, in a $550,000 transaction. Crites sold KBLU to Sun Country Broadcasting of Texas for $880,000 in 1983; Sun Country also bought country music station 95.1 KTTI at the same time.

KBLU and KTTI were owned by Robert Tezak, the original marketer of the card game Uno, from 1988 to 1995. That year, they were purchased out of bankruptcy by Commonwealth Broadcasting, owner of KYJT (now KQSR).

Changes in Ownership
In a quick succession of owners, Commonwealth was acquired by Capstar in 1997. Capstar merged with Chancellor Broadcasting to form AMFM in 1998. San Antonio-based Clear Channel Communications acquired AMFM in 1999.

Expanded Band assignment

On March 17, 1997 the FCC announced that eighty-eight stations had been given permission to move to newly available "Expanded Band" transmitting frequencies, ranging from 1610 to 1700 kHz, with KBLU authorized to move from 560 to 1640 kHz. However, the station never procured the Construction Permit needed to implement the authorization, so the expanded band station was never built.

Later history

Clear Channel sold its Yuma stations, KBLU, KTTI and KQSR, to current owner El Dorado Broadcasters in 2007.

In 2017, KBLU became one of the few local stations that broadcast its content on line. In 2018, the webcast was restricted to only the Russ Clark Show, which through its Washington DC Bureau Chief, George Braun, features interviews with members of Congress, administration officials and political commentators.

References

External links
 Official Website

 FCC History Cards for KBLU (and KYUM pre-1969)

BLU (AM)
News and talk radio stations in the United States
Radio stations established in 1940
1940 establishments in Arizona